Frank Martin Thompson (April 21, 1886 – September 13, 1918) was an American football and baseball player and coach.  He served as the head football coach at Wake Forest University from 1911 to 1913, compiling a record of 5–19.  Thompson was also the head baseball coach at North Carolina College of Agriculture and Mechanic Arts—now North Carolina State University—from 1908 to 1911 and at Wake Forest from 1913 to 1914.  A native of Raleigh, North Carolina, Thompson graduated from North Carolina A&M in 1909.  He played on the school's varsity football team from 1905 to 1908 and the varsity baseball team from 1906 to 1908.  Martin served as a lieutenant in 15th Machine Gun Battalion during World War I.  He was killed in action on September 13, 1918 at the Battle of Saint-Mihiel.  Frank Thompson Hall at North Carolina State University was named in his honor.

Head coaching record

Football

References

External links
 

1886 births
1918 deaths
American football fullbacks
Baseball catchers
NC State Wolfpack baseball coaches
NC State Wolfpack baseball players
NC State Wolfpack football players
Wake Forest Demon Deacons baseball coaches
Wake Forest Demon Deacons football coaches
American military personnel killed in World War I
United States Army officers
Sportspeople from Raleigh, North Carolina
Players of American football from Raleigh, North Carolina
Baseball players from Raleigh, North Carolina
United States Army personnel of World War I